Live... Gathered in Their Masses is a live album and film by English heavy metal band Black Sabbath. It features performances from their 2013 world tour, recorded in Melbourne, Australia on 29 April and 1 May 2013. It was released 26 November 2013 as a CD, DVD, Blu-ray, and a deluxe box set.

The title is drawn from the opening line of "War Pigs".

Track listing
All songs written by Geezer Butler, Tony Iommi, Ozzy Osbourne and Bill Ward, except where noted.
DVD/Blu-ray

CD

Deluxe Box Set Bonus DVD/Blu-ray

Charts

Album charts

Video charts

Certifications

Personnel
Black Sabbath
 Tony Iommi – guitars
 Geezer Butler – bass 
 Ozzy Osbourne – vocals
 
Additional musicians
 Adam Wakeman – keyboards
 Tommy Clufetos – drums

References

2013 live albums
Black Sabbath live albums
Vertigo Records live albums